The Zlin Z-526 Akrobat is a Czech sports plane used in aerobatics.

History
The Z-526 was originally designed by Zlin Aircraft in 1959. Its two-seat version is called the Trener-Master

The Z 526's layout was organized with the pilot in the rear, and the student in front. The aircraft could be equipped also with tip tanks and a constant speed propeller. The Z-526F was introduced in 1968 and was equipped with a 135 kW (180 hp) Avia M 137A engine, the export version Z-526L differing by being equipped with a 150 kW (200 hp) Lycoming AEIO-360 flat-four. Single-seat versions included the Z-526A, Z-526AS, and the Z-526AFS.

The Z-526 AFM was built between 1981 and 1984 and was powered by a 155 kW (210 hp) Avia M337 engine, had tip tanks and a lengthened fuselage. The aircraft was later developed into the Zlin Z-726.

More than 1,400 Z-526s were manufactured, many for military and private flying schools.

Variants
Z-526
 Two-seat version
Z-526A
 Single-seat version
Z-526AF
 Single-seat version
Z-526AFS
 Single-seat version
Z-526AFM Condor
powered by an Avia M337 inverted six-cylinder engine giving 210hp(157kW)

Aircraft On Display
Serbia
 Z-526M  - Museum of Aviation (Belgrade) in Belgrade

Specifications (Z-526 Trener-Master)

References

External links 

Moravan Aeroplanes, Inc., The Czech Republic - manufacturer
Zlin Treners -This aeroplane teaches you to fly!-

1960s Czechoslovakian sport aircraft
Single-engined tractor aircraft
Z526
Low-wing aircraft
Aircraft first flown in 1959